Andy Ryan (born 29 September 1994) is a Scottish professional footballer who plays as a striker for Larne.

Ryan began his career with Hamilton Academical, before moving on to Forfar Athletic and subsequently playing with Airdrieonians, Dunfermline Athletic, and Stirling Albion. He has also spent periods on loan with Brechin City and Arbroath.

Career
He made his club debut for Hamilton Academical on 23 July 2011, in the semi-final of the Scottish Challenge Cup, before making his Scottish Football League debut one week later.

Ryan was named SFL Young Player of the Month for February 2012, and was given a three-year contract in March 2012.

In June 2012, Ryan praised the club's youth set-up. In September 2012, Ryan suffered an ankle injury. At the start of the 2013–14 season, Ryan publicly stated that he was eager to prove his worth for new manager Alex Neil.

On 18 October 2013, Ryan signed a one-month loan deal with Brechin City. After returning to Hamilton, he admitted his chances at the club had been limited but he was still grateful to play there. In April 2015 he signed a new contract with the club, until the summer of 2016. On 13 August 2015, Ryan joined Arbroath on a three-month loan. He left Hamilton by mutual consent in December 2015.

After leaving Hamilton, Ryan played three matches as trialist for Arbroath, scoring once against Clyde. He then signed for Forfar Athletic in January 2016.

Ryan signed for Airdrieonians in May 2016.

After a successful season with Airdrieonians, Ryan was signed for an undisclosed fee by Scottish Championship side Dunfermline Athletic on 15 August 2017. On the same day, Ryan made his debut for the Pars in a Scottish Challenge Cup match against his former club Arbroath, scoring both goals in a two-nil victory at East End Park. In January 2020 he returned to Airdrieonians on loan, scoring twice in 7 appearances. In May he was released by Dunfermline at the end of his contract.

Shortly after leaving Dunfermline, Ryan signed a deal with Scottish League Two side Stirling Albion. After a successful season in Stirling, Ryan returned to his first club Hamilton Academical on 28 June 2021, signing a two-year deal.

Ryan left Hamilton on 23 January 2023, to sign for Northern Irish club Larne.

Career statistics

References

1994 births
Living people
Scottish footballers
Hamilton Academical F.C. players
Brechin City F.C. players
Arbroath F.C. players
Forfar Athletic F.C. players
Airdrieonians F.C. players
Dunfermline Athletic F.C. players
Stirling Albion F.C. players
Scottish Football League players
Scottish Professional Football League players
Association football forwards
Larne F.C. players